Events in the year 1316 in Norway.

Incumbents
Monarch: Haakon V Magnusson

Events
The Great Famine of 1315–1317.

Arts and literature

Births
Magnus IV of Sweden, King (died 1374).

Deaths

References

Norway